Little Superman is a 2014 Indian superhero film directed by Vinayan, starring Master Deni Emmanuel Jacklin, Baby Nayanthara, Ansiba Hassan and Praveena in the lead roles. The film was inspired by the superhero character Superman. The film was dubbed and released in Tamil and Hindi.

Premise
Willy Wilson, a 12 year old comic book aficionado, falls into a manhole and gets trapped inside it for days and soon figures out that he has the ability to fly and lift things up with the help of telekinesis.

Cast
 Master Deni Emmanuel Jacklin 
 Nayanthara
 Ansiba Hassan
 Praveena as Jeny Wilson
 Madhu
 Krishna
 Saju Navodaya
 Nizhalgal Ravi

Release
Little Superman was released on 7 November 2014 (India).

See also
 Superhero film

References

External links
 

2014 films
2010s Malayalam-language films
2010s Indian superhero films
2010s children's fantasy films
Indian children's films
Films directed by Vinayan
Indian superhero films